The following is a list of pipeline accidents in the United States in 1977. It is one of several lists of U.S. pipeline accidents. See also: list of natural gas and oil production accidents in the United States.

Incidents 

This is not a complete list of all pipeline accidents. For natural gas alone, the Pipeline and Hazardous Materials Safety Administration (PHMSA), a United States Department of Transportation agency, has collected data on more than 3,200 accidents deemed serious or significant since 1987.

A "significant incident" results in any of the following consequences:
 Fatality or injury requiring in-patient hospitalization.
 $50,000 or more in total costs, measured in 1984 dollars.
 Liquid releases of five or more barrels (42 US gal/barrel).
 Releases resulting in an unintentional fire or explosion.

PHMSA and the National Transportation Safety Board (NTSB) post-incident data and results of investigations into accidents involving pipelines that carry a variety of products, including natural gas, oil, diesel fuel, gasoline, kerosene, jet fuel, carbon dioxide, and other substances. Occasionally pipelines are re-purposed to carry different products.

The following incidents occurred during 1977:
 On January 2, a gas pipeline ruptured and burned near Nursery, Texas. Some power poles were destroyed, but there were no injuries.
 On January 5, in Fairview, New Jersey, a circumferential break on a 6-inch cast iron gas pipe occurred. The released gas then migrated under frozen soil & a sidewalk, into an area under the floor of a building. The gas later was ignited by an unknown source, causing an explosion that killed 1 person, injured 13 others, and destroyed 3 buildings.
 In Baltimore, Maryland on January 13, a 4-inch cast iron gas line suffered a circumferential break. The gas migrated under frozen soil and pavement into nearby rowhouses, and was likely ignited by an oil burned motor. One person was killed. 
 On January 18, an 18-inch steel gas main failed and leaked into an electrical and telephone conduit in New Bedford, Massachusetts. Three explosions followed, destroying 5 buildings, and breaking windows nearby. Improper pipeline construction techniques were the cause of the failure. There were no injuries.    
 A gas pipeline exploded and burned in Stockton, California on February 4, four days after another gas pipeline fire nearby. There were no injuries.
 On February 22, an explosion occurred on a gas pipeline being repaired, near Munday, Texas. 2 of the crew were killed, and another injured. 
 On May 20, fire broke out at a MAPCO pipeline pumping station and Terminal in Ogden, Iowa, threatening 4 propane storage tanks for a time. There were no injuries.
 In June, a Williams Partners pipeline terminal near Lawrence, Kansas spilled about 33,600 gallons of gasoline. The next spring, a rancher nearby was still having gasoline entering a creek on his property.
 An explosion on July 8 at Trans-Alaska Pipeline System Pump Station No. 8 killed one worker, injured 5 others, and destroyed the pump station. Over $2 million in damage was done. A US House of Representatives Committee later announced the cause was workers not following the proper procedures, causing crude oil to flow into a pump under repair at the time.
 On July 19, the Trans-Alaska Pipeline System pipeline was shut down for the 4th time in a month, when it was hit in a valve by a front loader.
 A 12-inch propane pipeline ruptured near Ruff Creek, in Greene County, Pennsylvania, from stress corrosion cracking, on July 20. The resulting propane vapor cloud ignited, when a truck that was driven into the cloud stalled, then created a spark, when it was restarted. The two men in the truck were killed, as well as 57 head of cattle, along with destruction of power lines and wooded areas. Subsidence of underground coal mines in the area may have hastened the failure.
 A cast iron gas main broke in Cherokee, Alabama on July 30. Gas migrated into a home through a recently back filled sewer line trench, and exploded 5 days later.
 In August, a car drove through leaking liquid from a petroleum pipeline in Lakewood, California. The pooled liquid appeared to be mud, but it exploded and burned, injuring a woman in the car.
 On August 9, natural gas under 20 psi pressure entered a 6-ounce per square inch gas distribution system in El Paso, Texas, over pressuring 750 gas customers. Numerous small fires resulted from this. The cause was an error during gas pipeline replacement.
 On August 15, crude oil spilled at Trans-Alaska Pipeline System Pump Station No. 9. There was no fire, but a fire or explosion at that station could have shut down that pipeline, since Pump Station No. 8 was out of service from the previous month's accident there. This was the seventh accident on this pipeline since the start up of the Alaska pipeline on June 20, 1977. The NTSB released three recommendations on September 9, 1977, to correct certain design and operating deficiencies in the pump rooms of each station of the Alyeska system.
 A gas transmission pipeline exploded, forcing hundreds to evacuate in Columbus, Indiana on August 26. There was no fire or injuries.
 On September 5, 2 brothers in a moving truck drove into a vapor cloud from a leak at a gas compressor plant in New Cuyama, California, igniting the cloud. One was killed immediately, and the other died 11 days later.
 On September 10, a pipeline rupture spilled  of gasoline into a creek in Toledo, Ohio. Corrosion of the pipeline caused the failure.
 A gas line inside a building in San Francisco, California leaked and exploded, injuring 7 and heavily damaging that building. Gas repair crews were working on the line at the time.
 On October 12, a bulldozer ruptured a propane pipeline near Albany, Georgia, causing nearby train traffic to be halted. The bulldozer engine was left running, nearly igniting the vapors.
 On October 30, a bulldozer hit a gas pipeline in Shreveport, Louisiana. The gas ignited, causing a 100 foot tall flame, killing one, and injuring 2 people.
 On November 6, a bulldozer being used by contractors for pipeline work stuck a 10 inch propane pipeline, near Ashland, Kansas. The bulldozer operator was seriously burned, and the bulldozer destroyed.  
 A backhoe being used to install a pipeline hit an adjacent 6-inch propane pipeline on November 21 in Hutchinson, Kansas. Fire broke out, but there were no injuries.
 Construction workers punctured a 12-inch gas pipeline in Atlanta, Georgia, with an I-beam on December 1. No fire or explosion followed, but thousands of people were evacuated from nearby buildings.
 On December 10, a 2-inch plastic gas main cracked and migrated under a paved parking area in Tempe, Arizona. The gas reached a building 35 feet away from the leak, where it was ignited by a cigarette. The explosion and fire that followed killed 2 people, and injured 3 others. Investigations showed the main had been damaged previous, and had been repaired by applying a piece of tape, by a non-gas company person.
 A compression coupling joint between a plastic and a steel gas line pulled apart in Lawrence, Kansas on December 15. The gas migrated into 2 buildings, and exploded, killing 2 people, and injuring 3 others.

References

Lists of pipeline accidents in the United States